The Garzas River is a river of Adjuntas, Puerto Rico.  Garzas is a tributary to the Río Grande de Arecibo river.

See also
List of rivers of Puerto Rico

References

External links
 USGS Hydrologic Unit Map – Caribbean Region (1974)
 Rios de Puerto Rico

Rivers of Puerto Rico